Keshav Prasad Upadhyaya was a Nepalese judge who served as 13th Chief Justice of Nepal, in office from 16 December 1999 to 5 December 2002. He was appointed by the then-king of Nepal, Birendra.

Upadhyaya was preceded by Mohan Prasad Sharma and succeeded by Kedar Nath Upadhyay.

References 

Chief justices of Nepal